The Ministry of Atomic Energy (Minatom) was a government ministry in the Soviet Union.

Created soon after the Chernobyl disaster, the ministry assumed responsibility for all nuclear energy in the USSR while the control of individual atomic stations remained with the State Committee for the Utilization of Atomic Energy (GKAE).

List of ministers
Source:
  (9 September 1986 - 17 July 1989)
 Vitaliy Konovalov (17 July 1989 - 24 August 1991)

References

Atomic Energy